Tecticrater compressa is a species of very small deepwater limpet, a marine gastropod mollusc in the family Lepetellidae.

Distribution
This marine species is endemic to New Zealand.

References

 Powell A. W. B., New Zealand Mollusca, William Collins Publishers Ltd, Auckland, New Zealand 1979 

Lepetellidae
Gastropods of New Zealand
Gastropods described in 1908